The Pennsylvania State Game Lands Number 148 are Pennsylvania State Game Lands in Lawrence and Beaver Counties in Pennsylvania in the United States providing hunting, bird watching, cross-country skiing, and other activities.

Geography
The Game Lands consists of two parcels located just a few miles west of Ellwood City. Located in New Beaver borough and Wayne Township in Lawrence County, with a small portion in the borough of Big Beaver in Beaver County. Other nearby populated places are Chewton, Coverdale, Possum Hollow, and Wampum.

Statistics

Biology
Game Lands 148 is 95% forested with most of the forest cover red oak (Quercus) along with aspen (Populus tremuloides), beech (Fagus), black cherry (Prunus serotina), maple (Acer), spruce (Picea), and tuliptree (Liriodendron tulipifera). Fur and game includes coyote (Canis latrans), white-tailed deer (Odocoileus virginianus), gray fox (Urocyon cinereoargenteus), red fox (Vulpes Vulpes), ruffed grouse (Bonasa umbellus), pheasant (Phasianus cochicus), raccoon (Procyon lotor), gray squirrel, (Sciurus carolinensis), and wild turkey (Meleagris gallopavo).

See also
 Pennsylvania State Game Lands
 Pennsylvania State Game Lands Number 173, also located in Beaver County
 Pennsylvania State Game Lands Number 189, also located in Beaver County
 Pennsylvania State Game Lands Number 285, also located in Beaver County

References

148
Protected areas of Beaver County, Pennsylvania